The 1905 United States Senate election in Pennsylvania was held on January 17, 1905. Incumbent Philander C. Knox was elected by the Pennsylvania State Assembly to his first full term in the United States Senate.

Background
Republican Matthew Quay was elected by the Pennsylvania General Assembly to the United States Senate in the previous election in January 1901. He served until his death on May 28, 1904. In June 1904, Republican Philander C. Knox was appointed to serve out the remainder of Quay's term, ending on March 4, 1905, when he began a term in his own right.

Results
The Pennsylvania General Assembly, consisting of the House of Representatives and Senate, convened on January 17, 1905, to elect a Senator to serve the term beginning on March 4, 1905. The results of the vote of both houses combined are as follows:

|-
|-bgcolor="#EEEEEE"
| colspan="3" align="right" | Totals
| align="right" | 254
| align="right" | 100.00%
|}

See also 
 United States Senate elections, 1904 and 1905

References

External links
Pennsylvania Election Statistics: 1682-2006 from the Wilkes University Election Statistics Project

1905
United States Senate
Pennsylvania